Striosubulina is a genus of small, tropical, air-breathing land snails, terrestrial pulmonate gastropod mollusks in the family Achatinidae.

Species 
The genus Striosubulina includes the following species:
 Striosubulina striatella Rang

References 

 Mentioned as a genus at: 

Subulininae